Access to justice is a basic principle in rule of law which describe how citizens have equal access to the legal systems in their context. Most contexts have initiatives and programs are designed to provide legal services to populations that may otherwise have difficulty obtaining legal advice and representation. Without access to justice, people are not able to fully exercise their rights, challenge discrimination, or hold decision-makers accountable for their actions.

The manner in which nations help their citizens gain access to justice vary by nation. Access to justice may be increased through properly funded and staffed legal aid organizations that provide free legal services to the poor, and through pro bono programs through which volunteer attorneys provide services and representation, or through other programs designed to help people gain. Access to justice is a broad concept that includes legal remedies in courts but also in other institutions of justice.

International initiatives

Free Access to Law Movement 

The Free Access to Law Movement (FALM) was founded in 1992, with the goal of providing free online access to basic legal information and resources. In 2002, FALM adopted the Declaration on Free Access to Law. The goal of the movement has been to ensure that legal information is freely available to everyone. The declaration declared public legal information to be the common heritage of mankind.

The member organizations of FALM, primarily through the Internet, engaged in widespread publication of primary and secondary legal information. Early examples include the Legal Information Institute at Cornell Law School and the Australasian Legal Information Institute, a joint project of the University of Technology Sydney and the University of New South Wales. The latter involved early adoption of hypertext technology to represent laws as a network of nodes, each representing a section.

In 2013, Cornell Law School established the Journal of Open Access to Law, to promote international research on the topic of open access to law.

Initiatives by country

Japan 
Japan Legal Support Center, which is abbreviated as JLSC,  provides a legal access to justice in any place in Japan.   JLSC was founded on April 10, 2006 and started its operation on October 2, 2006.

JLSC has 50 local offices and 11 branch offices of the local offices.

Myanmar 
MyJustice is a European Union-funded Access to Justice Initiative aiming to equip the people of Myanmar with the knowledge, confidence and opportunities to resolve conflicts fairly, equitably and justly. Since 2015 they have setting up a number of "justice centres" across Myanmar to improve access to justice by offering free legal advice to low-income and marginalised people, as well as being involved in projects relating to the introduction of legal aid and legal training.

Pakistan 
Access to Justice Initiatives (AJI) are a cluster of projects carried out by the Sarhad Rural Support Programme (SRSP) in Khyber Pakhtunkhwa, Pakistan, which aim at enhancing legal awareness and empowering citizens at the grass-roots level by enabling them to lobby for their rights and seek remedies for their legal problems.

Configuration 
Access to Justice Initiatives comprises the following projects:
 Legal Empowerment
 Aitebaar Alternate Dispute Resolution
 Aitebaar Awareness Rising
 Strengthening Rule of Law in Malakand
 Community Based Conflict Resolution

Features 
A common feature of the projects is that they all aim at strengthening the capacity of the disadvantaged communities to protect their rights and to participate and hold public institutions accountable. In traditional hierarchical societies, civil society organisations face challenges in promoting access to services for marginalized and vulnerable groups.

The projects seek to addresses issues of weak links among justice mechanisms and a lack of reliable legal support. Some of the projects focus on the informal justice institutions so that alternative dispute resolution methods can be used to settle disputes at community level, while helping to create a forum for dialogue between the formal and informal mechanisms. Members of the communities are trained as paralegals to bridge the gap between the most vulnerable members of society and the state institutions. In remote and backward areas of Pakistan the public at large is reluctant in trusting the police or lawyers but shows greater inclination in trusting notables of their own communities, who often resolve disputes via the Jirga system. The paralegals and mediators are briefed about human rights, legal system and the limits of their authority in solving complicated disputes. This ensures that rights of the participants are not forfeited. The Dispute Resolution Councils (DRC’s) set up in this respect are required to work in collaboration the local police to ensure transparency and efficiency. A significant number of women have been trained as mediators and paralegal to make the programme more receptive to women.

Legal aid is provided to individuals whose troubles cannot be resolved through negotiation, conciliation, mediation or other informal method's. Very often, case which merit legal aid involve issues of child marriage, forced marriage, matrimonial cruelty, child custody, deprivation of inheritance, discrimination etc.

United States 
Because the traditional model for delivery services demanded all legal work to be done in a bespoke manner the supply of legal services is generally inelastic. Households that are ineligible for legal aid but are not able to easily afford bespoke legal services are effectively underserved by the traditional model. A report by the American Bar Association Standing Committee on the Delivery of Legal Services found that "among moderate-income households, 39% used the legal system to attempt resolution of their legal problems, 23% attempted resolution without legal help, and 26% took no action."

Technological solutions
Lawyers, designers, and computers scientists have considered ways to use technology to improve access to justice for people who cannot afford a lawyer. Often called justice technology, this "refers to a technology or data project that is used in the administration of a justice system or service, creates access to that system or service, or increases the agency of justice system-involved people through support, like information or assistance."  While there is increased attention and funding going into the justice technology sector, it has yet to see large scale successes.

There are numerous university-based programs working at the intersection of access to justice and technology:

The Georgetown University Law Center started a Judicial Innovation Fellowship program in the fall of 2022. The novel program will place private industry technologists in state and tribal courts to develop new software that improves the public's access to justice and court administration.  

The Berkman Center at Harvard Law School has been working with Massachusetts housing court judge Dina Fein to design access to civil justice in the state for pro se litigants, low-income people, litigants who aren't proficient in English, and people with disabilities. CodeX, the Stanford Center for Legal Informatics, hosts projects such as Legal.io and Ravel Law, addressing the application of legal informatics to access to justice issues, and convenes a community bringing researchers, lawyers, entrepreneurs and technologists together to work side-by-side to advance the frontier of legal technology.

Illinois Institute of Technology (IIT's) Institute of Design and the Chicago-Kent College of Law collaborated on a multi-year redesign of self-represented litigants' court experience. Their 2002 report documented their investigation of current assistance systems, creation of a new design protocol, and plan for a new system design. The report also puts forward a number of concept designs, reimagining how the court system may work and people may access it. Some of their proposals include:
 "CourtNet", a network inside the court building, to link together judicial staff and the public;
 "Interactive Translator", a software tool that can be used in interviewing and court exchanges, able to translate verbal and text communications into different languages;
 "Archetypes", a diagnosis platform that models users' legal problems, classifies them, and offers referral services; 
 "Pursuit Evaluator", an online tool to allow potential litigants evaluate whether pursuing a case would be worth their time, money, and effort
 "Complaint Formulator", an electronic interface to let litigants extract data from their problem situation and assemble it into various legal documents;
 "Informer", software that uses sample cases to help litigants model their own forms and teaches them how to file correctly; and
 "Case Tracker", an interactive searchable archive of a litigant's case history, that provides a clear timeline and reference to past actions.

References 

Legal aid
Rural development in Pakistan
Human rights organisations based in Pakistan